Aurora Watten Mikalsen (born 21 March 1996) is a Norwegian professional footballer who plays as a goalkeeper for Toppserien club Brann. She has represented the Norway national team at multiple youth levels and received her first senior call-up in February 2018.

She previously played in England with FA Women's Super League clubs Manchester United and Tottenham Hotspur.

Club career

Norway
Having started her youth career with her hometown team Clausenengen, Mikalsen moved to Arna-Bjørnar in August 2012. On 2 November 2013, Mikalsen made her senior debut, starting for Arna-Bjørnar in a 2–1 Toppserien defeat to Vålerenga.

In 2015, Mikalsen returned to Clausenengen. She split playing time between the under-19s and senior 2. divisjon team. Mikalsen was also a regular starter for Clausenengen FK boys U19, which won the regional championship in the 2015 season.

On 16 December 2015, Mikalsen signed with Kolbotn ahead of the 2016 Toppserien season. On 28 March 2016, Mikalsen made her debut for the team in a 1–1 draw with LSK Kvinner.

Manchester United
In July 2019, Mikalsen trained with FA WSL club Manchester United while the team was on tour in Oslo. On 6 September 2019, Manchester United made the permanent signing of Mikalsen, in need of a backup after injuries to Emily Ramsey and Fran Bentley coupled with the pregnancy of Siobhan Chamberlain left the team with only Mary Earps to start the season. She made her debut on 21 November 2019, starting in an 11–1 League Cup Group Stage victory over Championship team Leicester City. She left at the end of the season following the expiration of her contract having made one appearance.

Tottenham Hotspur

On 27 July 2020, it was announced Mikalsen had signed a one-year contract with WSL team Tottenham Hotspur. With Spurs in good form having won their last three matches and only conceded twice, Mikalsen was forced into a debut on 31 January 2021 with regular starter Rebecca Spencer injured. She started in a 4–0 loss Chelsesa. Mikalsen remained starter for the duration of Spencer's injury absence, playing a total of five games, all in the WSL. Spurs lost 1–0 to Aston Villa, 3–2 to Everton, and 2–0 to Brighton & Hove Albion before Mikalsen earned her first and only clean sheet for Spurs as part of a goalless draw with Reading. She left at the end of the season upon the expiry of her contract.

Sandviken
On 28 July 2021, Mikalsen returned to Norway to sign with Toppserien side Sandviken.

International career
Mikalsen has represented the Norway national team at under-15, under-16, under-17, under-19 and under-23 level.

In 2018, Mikalsen received her first senior call-up as part of the 2018 Algarve Cup squad. A year later, Mikalsen was part of the senior squad that won the 2019 Algarve Cup. She made her debut in the 2022 Algarve Cup against Portugal.

Career statistics

Club

Honours

International
 Algarve Cup: 2019

References

External links
 Kolbotn profile

1996 births
Living people
Sportspeople from Kristiansund
Norwegian women's footballers
Women's association football goalkeepers
Arna-Bjørnar players
Clausenengen FK players
Kolbotn Fotball players
SK Brann Kvinner players
Toppserien players
Norway women's youth international footballers
Norway women's international footballers
Norwegian expatriate women's footballers
Expatriate women's footballers in England
Norwegian expatriate sportspeople in England
Women's Super League players
Manchester United W.F.C. players
Tottenham Hotspur F.C. Women players
UEFA Women's Euro 2022 players